Muri may refer to the following Papuan languages:

 Mer language, spoken in the Bird's Neck, Indonesian Papua
 Guhu-Samane language, spoken in the Bird's Tail Peninsula, Papua New Guinea